Neoascia unifasciata is a species of hoverfly in the family Syrphidae.

Distribution
Austria.

References

Eristalinae
Insects described in 1898
Diptera of Europe
Taxa named by Gabriel Strobl